National Ribbon Skirt Day is a Canadian holiday celebrating the ribbon skirt traditionally worn by Indigenous women. It was first celebrated on 4 January 2023.

The day was inspired by the experience of Isabella Kulak, an Indigenous girl who wore a ribbon skirt to a "formal dress day" at her elementary school but was told it did not meet the standard of "formal dress". This interaction prompted a reaction on social media, a march to the school, and a push for the federal government to recognize the ribbon skirt.

Senator Mary Jane McCallum put forward Bill S-219, An Act respecting a National Ribbon Skirt Day, in honour of Kulak. The bill received unanimous support in Parliament and was passed into law in December 2022.

See also
Orange Shirt Day

References

External links
An Act respecting a National Ribbon Skirt Day

Observances in Canada
2023 establishments in Canada
Recurring events established in 2023
Annual events in Canada
Anti-bullying campaigns
Awareness days
January observances